The pink-winged phasma (Podacanthus typhon) is a species of phasmid that is endemic to Australia.

Range
This species is endemic to Australia. More specifically, it is found along the South-East coast, in the Murray-Darling basin, New South Wales.

Identification
The meso thorax of the Pink-winged Phasma is reduced in size and has small spines. The large wings are attached to the mesothorax. Underneath the body are spines that cover a small part of the thorax and abdomen. The legs are reddish pink. P. typhon is a small stick insect compared to the titan stick insect. Its size is similar to the children's stick insect, reaching a length of about 110 mm.

See also
List of Australian stick insects and mantids

References

 Balderson, J., Rentz, D.C.F. and Roach, A.M.E. (1998). in Houston, W.K.K. & Wells, A. (1998) (eds) Zoological Catalogue of Australia. Vol. 23. Archaeognatha, Zygentoma, Blattodea, Isoptera, Mantodea, Dermaptera, Phasmatodea, Embioptera, Zoraptera. Melbourne: CSIRO Publishing, Australia. pp. 347 – 376.
 Bedford, G.O. & Chinnick, L.J. (1966). Conspicuous displays in two species of Australian stick insects. Anim. Behav., 14: 518-521
Bedford, G.O. (1968). Notes on the biology of some Australian stick insects (Phasmatodea), Journal of the Australian Entomological Society, 7: 81-82.
 Bedford, G.O. (1978). Biology and ecology of the Phasmatodea. Annu. Rev. Entomol. 23: 125-149
 Campbell, K. G., Hadlington, P., 1967. The biology of the three species of phasmatids which occur in plague numbers in forests of south eastern Australia. Forestry Commission NSW Res. Note No. 20, 38 pp.
 Clark, J.T. (1976). The eggs of stick insects (Phasmida): a review with descriptions of the eggs of eleven species. Syst. Ent. 1: 95-105.
 Gray, G.R. (1833). The Entomology of Australia in a Series of Monographs. Part 1. The monograph of the genus Phasma. London: Longman & Co. 28 pp. 8 pls.
 Gray, G.R. (1835). ‘Synopsis of the Species of Insects Belonging to the Family of Phasmidae.’ 48pp. (Longman, Rees, Orme, Brown, Green and Longman: London.)
 Key, K.H.L. (1970). Phasmatodea (Stick-insects). pp. 394–404 in CSIRO (ed.) The Insects of Australia. A textbook for students and research workers. Melbourne: Melbourne University Press, Vol. 1, 1st Edn.
 Musgrave, A. (1922). Stick and Leaf Insects, Australian Museum Magazine, October, 1922, pp. 171–181.

External links
Phasmid Study Group: Podacanthus typhon

Phasmatidae
Insects of Australia
Endemic fauna of Australia
Insects described in 1835